Events in the year 1945 in Japan.

1945 was the last year of World War II and the first year of the Allied occupation.

Incumbents
Emperor: Hirohito
Prime Minister: Kuniaki Koiso, Kantarō Suzuki, Prince Higashikuni, Kijuro Shidehara
Minister of War: Gen Sugiyama, Korechika Anami
Minister of the Navy: Mitsumasa Yonai
Supreme Commander Allied Powers: Douglas MacArthur

Governors
Aichi Prefecture: 
 until 21 April: Shinji Yoshino
 21 April-10 June: Tadayoshi Obata
 starting 10 June: Ryuichi Fukumoto
Akita Prefecture: Tadashi Hisayasuhiroshi (until 27 October); Kinsaburo Ikeda (starting 27 October)
Aomori Prefecture: Hiroo Oshima (until 21 April); Motohiko Kanai (starting 21 April)
Ehime Prefecture: 
 until 21 April: Chiyoji Kizawa 
 21 April-27 October: Hiroyuki Doi 
 starting 27 October: Shotaro Toshima
Fukui Prefecture: Hatsuo Kato (until 21 April); Eminai Miyata (starting 21 April)
Fukushima Prefecture: Koichi Kameyama (until 27 October); Ishii Masakazu (starting 27 October)
Gifu Prefecture: 
 until 21 October: Masami Hashimoto 
 21 April-27 October: Okino Saturo
 starting 27 October: Yoshihira Nomura 
Gunma Prefecture: Toshio Takahashi 
Hiroshima Prefecture: 
 until 21 April: Mitsuma Matsumura
 21 April-10 June: Korekiyo Otsuka
 10 June-11 October: Genshin Takano
 11 October-27 October: Kyuichi Kodama
 starting 27 October: Tsunei Kusunose
Ibaraki Prefecture: 
 until 21 April: Hisashi Imai
 21 April-19 August: Masami Hashimoto
 starting 19 August: Yoji Tomosue
Iwate Prefecture: Tamemasu Miyata (until 21 April); Tamemasu Miyata (starting 21 April)
Kagawa Prefecture: 
 until 21 January: Yoshiji Kosuga
 21 January-21 April: Osamu Mori Izumi
 21 April-26 October: Masami Kimura
 starting 26 October: Shogo Tanaka
Kochi Prefecture: 
 until 21 April: Saburo Takahashi
 21 April-25 October: Kurihara Haya
 starting 25 October: Nagano Yoshitatsu
Kumamoto Prefecture: Soga Kajimatsu (until 27 October); Hirai Fumi (starting 27 October)
Kyoto Prefecture: 
 until June: Arai Zentaro
 June-October: Shigeo Miyoshi
 starting October: Atsushi Kimura
Mie Prefecture: 
 until 21 May: Yoshio Mochinaga
 21 May-27 October: Shigeo Shimizu
 starting 27 October: Kobayashi Chiaki
Miyagi Prefecture: 
 until 10 June: Tsurukichi Maruyama
 10 June-27 October: Motome Ikezumi
 starting 27 October: Saburo Chiba
Miyazaki Prefecture: Akira Taniguchi (until 27 October); Tadao Annaka (starting 27 October)
Nagano Prefecture: Yasuo Otsubo (until 27 October); Monobe Kaoruro (starting 27 October)
Niigata Prefecture: 
 until 1 February: Hatada Masatomi
 1 February-9 April: Kingo Chisato
 starting 9 April: Hatada Masatomi
Oita Prefecture: Motoharu Nakamura (until 27 October)
Okinawa Prefecture: 
 until 3 April: Osamu Mori Izumi
 12 January-3 April: Akira Shimada
 starting 20 August: Koshin Shikiya 
Saga Prefecture: Miyazaki Kenta (until 27 October); Genichi Okimori (starting 27 October)
Saitama Prefecture: Ryuichi Fukumoto (until 19 August); Sekigaiyo Otoko (starting 19 August)
Shiname Prefecture: Takeo Yamada (until 12 September); Kiyoshi Ito (starting 12 September)
Tochigi Prefecture: Soma Toshio
Tokyo: Nisho Toshizo (until 23 August); Hisatada Hirose (starting 23 August)
Toyama Prefecture: Shigero Okamoto (until 27 October); Keiichi Yoshitake (starting 27 October)
Yamagata Prefecture: 
 until 21 April: Michio Murayama
 21 April-27 October: Zhi Sasayama
 starting 27 October: Michio Murayama

Events

February 18 - U.S. Marines land on Iwo Jima.
March 10 - Major bombing of Tokyo
March 12 - First bombing of Nagoya.
March 13 - First bombing of Osaka.
March 26 - U.S. forces win the Battle of Iwo Jima, defeating the last remaining troops led by Tadamichi Kuribayashi.
April 7 - The Japanese battleship Yamato is sunk.
April 7 - Suzuki forms his cabinet.
May 24 - Second major bombing of Tokyo.
May 29 - First bombing of Yokohama.
July 26 - Allies issue Potsdam Declaration; Japan refuses to agree to its terms.
August 6 - Atomic bombing of Hiroshima.
August 8 - Soviet Union declares war on Japan.
August 9 - Atomic bombing of Nagasaki.
August 15 - Last Allied bombing of Japan takes place in Odawara and Tsuchizaki.
August 15 - Emperor Hirohito declares Japan's acceptance of the Potsdam Declaration.
August 30 - Douglas MacArthur arrives in Japan.
September 2 - Japanese officials sign instrument of surrender on the deck of the USS Missouri.
24 September - Hirohito  says that he did not want war and blames Tojo for the attack on Pearl Harbor
October 2 - Office of the Supreme Commander Allied Powers is established at the Dai-Ichi Seimei Building in Tokyo.
October 5 - Higashikuni cabinet resigns.
October 9 - Shidehara cabinet is formed.
October 15 - Peace Preservation Law is repealed.
October 31 – A news agency, Dōmei, officially disbanded, on following day, the news agency operation in nationwide, which separated into Kyōdō News Service and Jiji Press. 
November 6 – According to Japan Coast Guard official confirmed report, a passenger ship Toyo-maru No 10, capsized off Hakata Island, Seto Inland Sea, Ehime Prefecture, 397 persons were perished.
November 12 – According to Fukuoka Prefecture official confirmed report, a large scale explosion, while to Allied Peacekeeping Forces were disposing of weapons hidden by Japanese Imperial Army in Futamata Tunnel in Soeda, Kyushu Island, 147 persons were human fatalities and 149 persons were wounded.
December 9 – According to Japan Coast Guard official confirmed report, a passenger ship Sekirei-maru capsized by overcapacity and rough sea off Akashi, Hyogo Prefecture, total 304 persons were their lost to lives.
December 17 - Women's suffrage is granted in Diet elections.
December 18 - House of Representatives is dissolved: Diet elections called for April 1, 1946.

Births
January 6: Toshiko Hamayotsu, politician
January 29: Yoko Shinozaki, volleyball player
February 16: Masataka Itsumi, television announcer and singer (died 1993)
February 25: Toshikatsu Matsuoka, politician (died 2007)
March 7: Sadakazu Tanigaki, politician
March 13: Sayuri Yoshinaga, actress
March 14: Komaki Kurihara, actress
June 9: Yūji Aoki, manga artist (died 2003)
June 14: Hiroshi Miyauchi, actor
July 6: Kyōzō Nagatsuka, actor
July 7: Ikezawa Natsuki, author
July 10: Katsuji Mori, voice actor and narrator
July 19: Kenji Kimura, volleyball player
July 25: Masakatsu Morita, Tatenokai member (died 1970)
August 6: Yoshinori Sakai, Olympic flame torchbearer (died 2014)
August 20: Tomio Sumimoto, sprint canoer
August 22: Tamori, entertainer
September 3: Fusako Shigenobu, leader of the Japanese Red Army
September 12: Yumiko Fujita, actress
October 2: Shigenobu Murofushi, athlete
October 9: Kiyoko Suizenji, enka singer
October 19: Shigeo Nakata, wrestler
October 25: Keaton Yamada, voice actor and narrator
November 16: Haruko Okamoto, figure skater
December 15: Kimiko Kasai, jazz singer
December 23: Noriko Tsukase, voice actress (died 1989)

Deaths
January 9: Shigekazu Shimazaki, career officer
February 26: Sanji Iwabuchi
March 22: Takeichi Nishi
March 26: Tadamichi Kuribayashi
April 1: Gōtarō Ogawa
May 11: Kiyoshi Ogawa, naval aviator (suicide)
March 17: Tatsugo Kawaishi, swimmer (b. 1911)
April 16: Toshiko Tamura, novelist (b. 1884)
May 16: Shintarō Hashimoto, admiral (b. 1892)
May 21: Prince Kan'in Kotohito, Chief of Army General Staff (b. 1865)
June 3: Fusashige Suzuki, athlete
June 7: Kitaro Nishida, philosopher (b. 1870)
June 22: Isamu Chō, officer (suicide)
June 23: Mitsuru Ushijima, general (suicide)
August 6: Senkichi Awaya, mayor of Hiroshima
August 15:
Korechika Anami, war leader (suicide)
Matome Ugaki, admiral
August 16: Takijirō Ōnishi, admiral (suicide)
August 17: Shimaki Kensaku, author  (b. 1903)
August 20: Masahiko Amakasu, officer (suicide)
August 24:
Midori Naka, stage actress (b. 1909)
Shizuichi Tanaka, general (suicide)
September 9: Yoshitsugu Tatekawa, lieutenant-general
September 12: Hajime Sugiyama, field marshal (suicide) (b. 1880)
September 14: Kunihiko Hashida, physician and physiologist (suicide)
September 20: Chōtoku Kyan, Okinawan karate master
September 26: Kiyoshi Miki, philosopher
October 15: Mokutaro Kinoshita, author, Dramaturge, poet, art historian and literary critic
October 18: Yoshiki Hayama, writer (b. 1894)
October 28: Kesago Nakajima, lieutenant-general
November 30: Shigeru Honjō, general (suicide)
December 13: Goro Shiba, military leader during the Boxer Rebellion (b. 1860)
December 16: Fumimaro Konoe, former prime minister (suicide) (b. 1891)

See also
 List of Japanese films of the 1940s

References

 
1940s in Japan
Years of the 20th century in Japan
Japan
Japan